Focus is a Ukrainian national weekly news magazine, published in Kyiv. The magazine's motto: "Every detail has a meaning".

Overview
The launch of Focus magazine on 30 September 2006 was intended to fill the native news magazine market with corresponding competitor to more notorious magazines such as Newsweek, Der Spiegel, and others. The magazine consists of 84 fully illustrated pages of A4 format and issued every Friday (previously - every Saturday). Focus was one of the several other projects created by the Ukrainian Media Holding in 2006, among which were magazine Zdorovie, Dengi.ua, and others.

Lists
Similar to Forbes beside news publishing the magazine specializes in national popularization through a variety of rankings: "The most rich man in Ukraine", "The most influential woman in Ukraine", "Top 55 cities for living in Ukraine", and others.

 100 most influential women of Ukraine (since 2006)
 55 best cities for living in Ukraine (since 2007, originally as top-50)
 200 richest people in Ukraine (since 2006, other names: top-150 (2009), top-130 (2008), top-100 (2007))
 200 most influential Ukrainians (since 2007)
 25 most successful business-ladies of Ukraine (since 2010)
 The richest football clubs of Ukraine
 50 most influential people (by region) (Dnipropetrovsk - 2007, Kharkiv - 2007, Crimea - 2007, Odessa - 2008, Donbas - 2006, Donetsk - 2010)

References

External links

2006 establishments in Ukraine
Magazines established in 2006
Magazines published in Kyiv
Russian-language magazines
News magazines published in Ukraine
Ukrainian news websites
Weekly magazines